Adam Teuto, also known as Coloniensis (flourished 14th century) was an early German author whose Latin-language writings emphasized ecclesiastical topics.

Adam Teuto's works appeared between 1355 and 1370. He is known for summarising in mnemonic rhymes Raymundus of Pennaforte's then-well-circulated book, Summa de poenitentia et matrimonio, which ultimately became a handbook for the clergy.

Publications
 Summula clarissimi Raymundi brevissimo compendio sacramentorum alta complectens mysteria (1502). Cologne.

Sources
 Allgemeine Deutsche Biographie - online version at Wikisource

14th-century births
14th-century deaths
Year of birth unknown
Place of birth unknown
Year of death unknown
Place of death unknown
German male writers